The 1982 Bass and Golden Leisure Classic was a professional invitational snooker tournament which took place on 29 May 1982. The tournament was open to professional players who were not ranked in the top sixteen. The competition was held at the Golden Leisure Snooker Centre in Liverpool, was jointly sponsored by Golden Leisure and Bass-Charrington. It featured 22 professional players.

The ten qualifying matches were played under a best-of-three frames format, the last-16, quarter-final and semi-final matches best of five, and the final was best of seven. Rex Williams won the event, beating Ray Edmonds 4–1 in the final. Losing semi-finalists Eugene Hughes and Mike Hallett took part in a playoff match for third place, which Hughes won 2–0, making  of 91 and 73.

The event had a total prize fund of £2,150. Williams received £750 as winner, and Edmonds received £400 as runner-up. Hughes received £150, and Hallett got £80. Paul Medati received £100 for compiling the highest break of the event, 97.

Qualifying
Twenty players participated in qualifying for the last-16 stage of the event, to which Williams and Edmonds were already 'seeded'. John Phillips, Jim Donnelly and Tommy Murphy withdrew, so George Scott, Dennis Hughes and Clive Everton received walkovers.

Round 1

 Mick Fisher 2–1  Dean Reynolds
 Doug French 2–1  Kingsley Kennerley
 Eugene Hughes 2–0  Jack Fitzmaurice
 Murdo MacLeod 2–0  Ian Black
 Paul Medati 2–1  Les Dodd
 Jackie Rea 2–0  Joe Johnson
 Mark Wildman 2–1  Eddie McLaughlin

Main draw

Third -place playoff

 Eugene Hughes 2–0  Mike Hallett

Final

References

Snooker non-ranking competitions
Snooker competitions in England
1982 in snooker
1982 in English sport